Francis Fainifo (born 25 November 1983) is a rugby union player for Stade Français in the Top 14. He signed from the Brumbies in the Super Rugby competition in 2011. He plays on the wing. He was born in Auckland, New Zealand, but has played international rugby with Australia A.

Fainifo was educated at Eagle Vale High School, a notable rugby league school in Sydney's South West. Fainifo played both rugby union and league, playing for the Campbelltown Harlequins (Union) & Campbelltown City Kangaroos (League) respectively.

References

External links
 
 Brumbies profile
 Stade Français profile

1983 births
Living people
New Zealand rugby union players
Rugby union wings
ACT Brumbies players
Stade Français players
Canberra Vikings players
Rugby union players from Auckland
Rugby union players from Sydney
New Zealand emigrants to Australia
Expatriate rugby union players in France